Walter Panas High School is a comprehensive, four-year public high school serving students in grades 9–12 in Cortlandt Manor, New York, USA. It was opened in 1972, becoming the second high school to serve the Lakeland Central School District. It is a sister school to Lakeland High School of Shrub Oak, New York.

Performance
In 2015, students took 481 AP exams, with over 50% scoring a 3 (out of 5) or better. There were over 30 AP Scholars

Student life

Sports
Walter Panas sports teams include: Boys and Girls Cross Country; Boys Varsity & JV Football; Boys Varsity & JV Basketball; Girls Varsity & JV Basketball; Freshman Boys & Girls Basketball; Boys Varsity, JV, and Freshman Baseball; Varsity & JV Cheerleading; Girls Varsity & JV Softball; Girls Varsity & JV Volleyball; Boys Varsity & JV Soccer; Girls Varsity & JV Soccer; Girls Varsity Field Hockey; Girls Varsity & JV Lacrosse; Boys Varsity & JV Lacrosse; Ice Hockey; Boys & Girls Swimming, Wrestling, Gymnastics, Bowling, Winter Track and field and Girls and Boys Varsity Tennis.

Notable alumni

Laurence Ekperigin, British-American basketball player in the Israeli National League
Becca Balint, President pro tempore of the Vermont Senate

References

External links
 Walter Panas High School Website 
 Lakeland Central School District Website

Public high schools in Westchester County, New York